No Land is a music group made up of Azerbaijani, Iranian, Kurdish and Turkish musicians and named as No Land (without a country) in reference to their coming from different cultures and geographies. It got its name from the movie No man's land at the suggestion of Sahand Lesani.

No Land music group was first established in 2012 by Sahand Lesani, Mehmet Akif Ersoy and Kamil Hajiyev. Later, Çağatay Vural, Can Kalyoncu, Hazal Akkerman, Yağız Nevzat İpek and Oğuzcan Bilgin joined the group. No Land released their first album "Aramızda" as of 2016. The album "Aramızda" includes some of the work done since 2013 and these works generally consisted of the songs that emerged during the first formation of the group. The second album "Pusulası Kaybolmuş" was released on digital platforms on 6 February 2019. There are eight songs in the album in Turkish, Azerbaijani, Persian and Russian. As with the first album, the lyrics were written by Kamil Hajiyev and Vugar Hasani.

Albums

Aramızda 

 Pusulası kaybolmuş
 Yüzerdik
 Payız
 Niyə Belə Uzundur Bu Yollar
 Aramızda Dinozor
 Müstefilatun
 Değil
 Yolcu
 Sor
 Düşünme Kaybolursun
 52 Hertz Whale – Outro

Pusulası Kaybolmuş 

 Şehr-i yar
 Sodom Gomore
 Pusulası Kaybolmuş
 Lakrima
 Krilatiye Kacheli
 N'olmuş
 Pervin
 Seyir

References 

2003 establishments in Turkey
Jazz musicians
Turkish musicians
Azerbaijani musicians